Honey Creek Township is one of twelve townships in Vigo County, Indiana, United States. As of the 2010 census, its population was 17,179 and it contained 6,509 housing units.  It contains Terre Haute's main shopping district along U.S. Route 41 and is by far the most characteristically suburban of the twelve Vigo County townships. The population includes inmates from the Terre Haute Federal Penitentiary, located at its northwest corner.

Geography

Cities, towns, villages
 Terre Haute (southwest edge)

Unincorporated communities
 Allendale
 Southwood
 Spring Hill
 Woodgate
 Youngstown

Adjacent townships
 Harrison Township (north)
 Lost Creek Township (northeast)
 Riley Township (east)
 Pierson Township (southeast)
 Linton Township (south)
 Prairieton Township (west)
 Sugar Creek Township (northwest)

Cemeteries
The township contains these three cemeteries: Durham, Hull and Smith.

Landmarks
 Federal Bureau of Prisons Terre Haute Penitentiary (vast majority)

Demographics 
As of the census of 2000, there were 14,280 people and 5,794 households residing in the township. The population density was 423/mi2. The racial makeup of the township was 86.4% White, 8.1% Black or African American, 0.3% Native American, 3.5% Asian, less than 0.1% Pacific Islander, 0.5% from other races, and 1.1% from two or more races. 2.4% of the population were Hispanic or Latino of any race.

The average household size was 2.31 and the average family size was 2.91.
The median age was 31.6 years. For every 100 females, there were 118 males.

The median income for a household in the township was $42,065, and the median income for a family was $54,753. The per capita income for the township was $22,634. 6.4% of the population and 3.9% of families were below the poverty line.

School districts
 Vigo County School Corporation

Political districts
 Indiana's 8th congressional district
 State House District 46
 State Senate District 39

References
 United States Census Bureau 2007 TIGER/Line Shapefiles
 United States Board on Geographic Names (GNIS)
 IndianaMap

External links

Townships in Vigo County, Indiana
Terre Haute metropolitan area
Townships in Indiana